Everything Was Sound is the second studio album by American metalcore band Silent Planet. The album was released on July 1, 2016, through Solid State Records. It was co-produced by Will Putney and guitarist Spencer Keene. This is also the last album to feature Keene.

Background and promotion
On April 27, 2016, the band announced on Vans Warped Tour the album itself and the release date. They released three singles from the record with two of them are accompanying with music videos. "Panic Room" was available on May 12. "Psychescape", featuring Spencer Chamberlain of Underoath, was streaming on June 2. The third and final single, "Orphan", was unveiled on June 17.

Critical reception

Matt Conner states, "Everything Was Sound is a killer metalcore album." Kriston McConnell writes, "Silent Planet have written one of the most brutally honest metalcore albums in years." Lucas Munachen describes, "it's difficult to label Everything Was Sound as anything short of a masterpiece." Michael Weaver believes, "Everything Was Sound is certainly one of this year's best heavy albums." Scott Fryberger says, "The Night God Slept was an intense metalcore album that shot them straight up into the 'best of Solid State' group. 2016 is looking to be another strong year for the band, with Everything Was Sound sounding like the next logical step."

Track listing

Personnel
Credits adapted from AllMusic.

Silent Planet
 Garrett Russell – unclean vocals
 Spencer Keene – guitars, production
 Mitchell Stark – guitars
 Thomas Freckleton – bass, keyboards, clean vocals
 Alex Camarena – drums

Additional musicians
 Spencer Chamberlain of Underoath – guest vocals on track 2, "Psychescape"
 Cory Brandan of Norma Jean – guest vocals on track 8, "Nervosa"

Additional personnel
 Will Putney – production, mastering, mixing
 Brandon Ebel – executive production
 Randy Leboeuf – engineering
 R.D. Laing – liner notes
 Adam Skatula – A&R
 Jordan Butcher – art direction, design, illustrations

Charts

References

2016 albums
Silent Planet albums
Solid State Records albums